Sara Iren Lindbak Hørte (born 24 November 2000) is a Norwegian football player who plays for Rosenborg in Toppserien.

Club career 
Previously, she has played for KFUM Oslo in 4. division, before she moved to Øvrevoll Hosle in 2016. Before  Toppserien 2019 started, Hørte moved to Kolbotn.

She signed for Rosenborg BK Kvinner in August 2022.

International career 
Hørte has played matches for the Norway youth nation team U19 and U23.

In 2019, she was part of the Norway squad in UEFA Under-19 Championship in Scotland.

She was called up for the Norway national team for the first time in August 2022. She debuted and scored her first goal in the FIFA World Cup qualification against Albania, 6 September 2022.

References 

Kolbotn Fotball players
Norwegian footballers
Norwegian women's footballers
Rosenborg BK Kvinner players
Articles using sports links with data from Wikidata
2000 births
Living people
Women's association footballers not categorized by position